The name Seymour has been used for two tropical cyclones in the Eastern Pacific Ocean.

 Hurricane Seymour (1992) 
 Hurricane Seymour (2016)

Pacific hurricane set index articles